The Best of the Lovin' Spoonful is a 1967 compilation album by the Lovin' Spoonful featuring hits and other tracks from their first three albums.  It charted the highest of the group's career, hitting number three on the Billboard Top LPs chart.

The album also included 9" x 12" individual color photos ("Suitable for framing", as labeled) of John Sebastian, Joe Butler, Steve Boone, and Zal Yanovsky.

Reception

In his Allmusic review, music critic William Ruhlman wrote "this compilation is an attempt to balance group concerns rather than present their most successful performances. Nevertheless, it picks the strongest material from the group's three previous albums..."

Track listing

Side 1
 "Do You Believe in Magic" (John Sebastian) – 2:04 (from Do You Believe in Magic)
 "Did You Ever Have to Make Up Your Mind?" (John Sebastian) – 2:00 (from Do You Believe in Magic)
 "Butchie's Tune" (Steve Boone) – 2:34 (from Daydream)
 "Jug Band Music" (John Sebastian) – 2:49 (from Daydream)
 "Night Owl Blues" (John Sebastian/Zal Yanovsky/Steve Boone/Joe Butler) – 3:00 (from Do You Believe in Magic)
 "You Didn't Have to Be So Nice" (John Sebastian/Steve Boone) – 2:29 (from Daydream)

Side 2
 "Daydream" (John Sebastian) – 2:18 (from Daydream)
 "Blues in the Bottle" (Arranged and adapted by John Sebastian/Zal Yanovsky/Steve Boone/Joe Butler/Steve Weber/Peter Stampfel) – 2:10 (from Do You Believe in Magic)
 "Didn't Want to Have to Do It" (John Sebastian) – 2:06 (from Daydream)
 "Wild About My Lovin'" (Arranged and adapted by John Sebastian) – 2:38 (from Do You Believe in Magic)
 "Younger Girl" (John Sebastian) – 2:23 (from Do You Believe in Magic)
 "Summer in the City" (John Sebastian/Mark Sebastian/Steve Boone) – 2:39 (from Hums of the Lovin' Spoonful)

References

The Lovin' Spoonful albums
Kama Sutra Records compilation albums
1967 greatest hits albums